A constitutional referendum was held in Grenada on 6 November 2018. The proposed constitutional amendment, which voters ultimately rejected, would have made the Caribbean Court of Justice (CCJ) the final court of appeal, replacing the British Judicial Committee of the Privy Council, and renamed the Supreme Court. A slightly different proposal  was previously made in a 2016 referendum, but was also rejected by voters.

Antigua and Barbuda also held a referendum on joining the CCJ on the same day; that vote also failed to pass.

Question
Voters were asked to respond YES or NO to the following question:

Results
No votes outstripped yeses by 12,133 to 9,846, on a turnout of 28%. Prime Minister Keith Mitchell, whose government had called the vote, said he was "disappointed" but that he was "in total acceptance of the results".

References

Grenada
Referendums in Grenada
Constitutional
Constitutional referendums
Grenada